Gaetano is an Italian surname. Notable people with the surname include:

 Gianluca Gaetano, Italian professional footballer
 Nick Gaetano, artist
 Rino Gaetano, Italian musician and singer-songwriter

De Gaetano 

 Antonio De Gaetano, Italian male racewalker
 Giuseppe De Gaetano, Italian male race walker
 Vincent A. De Gaetano, Maltese judge

See also
 Gaetano, Italian masculine given name
 Gaetano (disambiguation)

Italian-language surnames